Alfred Buckland (17 December 1825 – 12 June 1903) was a New Zealand landowner, auctioneer, farmer, pastoralist and businessman. His house, Highwic, is registered by Heritage New Zealand as a Category I structure, with registration number 18.

Family
Buckland was born in Newton Abbot, Devonshire, England on 17 December 1825. His mother was Elizabeth (née Mortimore) and his father was the broker John Buckland. William Buckland was an elder brother who had arrived in Auckland in 1841 via Adelaide. Frank Buckland and John Buckland were his nephews. Their sister (his niece), the artist Bessie Hocken, was married to Thomas Hocken.

Arrival in New Zealand 
According to his obituary, Buckland was a farmer before leaving England in August 1850. Alfred and his wife Eliza arrived in New Zealand on the Sir Edward Paget in December 1850. In 1867, Buckland married Matilda Frodshan, shortly after the death of Eliza.

Life in New Zealand 
Buckland supplied horses to the British troops during the New Zealand Wars and along with James Banks, Thomas Morrin and then-Mayor of Auckland J. McCocsh Clark sold off a piece of land near Ellerslie Racecourse to the Auckland Agricultural and Pastoral Association. In the 1880s, Buckland bought extensive lands around Te Korowai-o-Te-Tonga Peninsula (Kaipara South Head), where he established a cattle run. He was later President of the association in 1883 and 1886. Alfred died aged 77 on 12 June 1903. He was regarded as "highly esteemed" and in Wellington was reported as "the well-known auctioneer".

References

1825 births
1903 deaths
New Zealand farmers
New Zealand businesspeople
English emigrants to New Zealand
Alfred